The Iron Gate II is a large dam on the Danube River, between Romania and Serbia.

Characteristics 

The dam is built at the Danube's . The project started in 1977 as a joint-venture between the governments of Romania and Yugoslavia for the construction of large dam on the Danube River which would serve both countries.

At the celebration ceremony for the 27 years since the power station's deployment it was announced that production in 2011 reached  despite bad weather conditions. As of 2018 the Serbian side of the power plant is in the process of revitalization; when finished, the power of each aggregate will be lifted from 27 to 32 MW.

In 2011, a border checkpoint between Serbia and Romania for cars and light cargo vehicles was open.

Iron Gate III Hydroelectric Power Station 

Plans for the third dam were drafted in 1973 by the Energoprojekt holding and Jaroslav Černi Institute. Selected location was the village of Dobra, in the Golubac municipality, at the Danube's . Iron Gate III was planned as the reversible power plant, which would pump water into the uphill reservoirs on the Brodica, Pesača and Železnički Potok localities. In total, after three phases of construction, the power plant would have a total installed capacity of 2,400 MW.

The studies were conducted into the 1980s, and the terrain was surveyed and measured, as it is made of karst. Apart from Yugoslavia and Romania, representatives of the electric companies from USSR and West Germany also participated in the surveys. Romania was to build a similar facility on its side of the river. Both states also planned additional power plants of 120 MW adjoining the third dams, which were to function only during the high water levels, accepting the water surplus. Besides the Iron Gate III dam, Yugoslavia also planned additional reversible power plant "Bistrica" (680 MW), built in the hills above the existing Bistrica power station on the Lim river. If built at the time, the Iron Gate III and Bistrica plants would make 37% of Serbian electricity production capacity in 2021.

In August 2021, the construction was tentatively announced for 2022, having a major role in Serbian transition to renewable energy sources, though the price was set to "several billion euros". Other projects were also announced, which experts consider more feasible due to the Iron Gate 3's high price and complex system. Also, with other projects being finished first, the Iron Gate 3 would exceed Serbian needs in electricity, so they proposed that project should be a regional and interstate one. The complex will be completed in three phases, and when finished, it will produce 484 GWh of electricity per year. In September 2021, U.S. company Bechtel expressed interest in building the dam, and the meeting between Bechtel's president Stu Jones, Serbian energy minister Zorana Mihajlović, and US ambassador to Serbia Christopher R. Hill was held on 1 August 2022.

By the end of the year, Serbian government allocated €1.5 billion in the 2022 budget for the construction of Iron Gate 3, or half of the total projected costs. The government also stated that a foreign, strategic partner will be needed. It is expected to be either some Chinese company (as they build numerous large infrastructure objects already), or a Russian one, as the Russians are already revitalizing the Iron Gate I dam. The construction is estimated to last for three to five years, in, now expanded four phases (I - 600 MW/2 billion KWh; II - 1.200 MW/3.1 billion MWh; III - 1.800 MW/5.2 billion KWh). After the final, phase IV, total capacity will reach 2.400 MW and annual production is estimated to 7.6 billion KWh. The power plant would be operational only at night.

See also

 Ostrovul Mare Bridge
 Iron Gate I Hydroelectric Power Station
 List of power stations in Romania
 Energy in Romania
 Energy in Serbia

References

External links 
 Description 
 The history of Iron Gate II 

Dams in Romania
Dams in Serbia
Elektroprivreda Srbije
Hydroelectric power stations in Romania
Hydroelectric power stations in Serbia
Romania–Serbia border crossings
Dams completed in 1984
Romania–Yugoslavia relations